The 2016 New York City FC season was the club's second season of competition and their second in the top tier of American soccer, Major League Soccer (MLS). New York City FC played their home games at Yankee Stadium in the New York City borough of The Bronx.

Results

Non-competitive

Friendlies

Rowdies Suncoast Invitational

IMG Suncoast Pro Classic

Competitive

Major League Soccer

League tables

Eastern Conference

Overall

Results summary

Results by round

Matches

MLS Cup Playoffs

U.S. Open Cup

Squad information

Statistics

Appearances and goals 

|-
|colspan="14"|Players who appeared for New York City FC who are no longer at the club:

|-
|}

Transfers

In

Loan in

Out

Loan out

Non-player transfers

Honors

MLS Player of the month

MLS Player of the week

MLS Team of the week

MLS Goal of the week

Fans' player of the month 
Awarded to the player who receives the most votes in a poll conducted each month on the NYCFC website

References 

New York City FC seasons
New York City FC
New York City FC
New York City FC